Stanislau, also transliterated as Stanislaŭ or Stanisłaŭ, is the Belarusian-language form of the given name Stanislav. It may refer to:

 Stanislau Bazhkou (born 1991), Belarusian cyclist 
 Stanislau Bulak-Balakhovich (1883 – 1940), Belarusian general
 Stanislau Drahun (born 1988), Belarusian professional footballer
 Stanislaus Katczinsky, All Quiet on the Western Front character
 Stanislau Neviarouski (born 1981), Belarusian former swimmer
 Stanislau Tsivonchyk (born 1985), Belarusian pole vaulter
 Stanislau Shcharbachenia (born 1985), Belarusian rower
 Stanislau Shushkevich (1934–2022), Belarusian politician and scientist.
 Stanislau Zhurauliou (born 1988), Belarusian modern pentathlete

See also
 Stanislau

Belarusian masculine given names